Uhl's Bay is a hamlet in the Canadian province of Saskatchewan. The hamlet is near Rowan's Ravine Provincial Park and Last Mountain Lake.

Demographics 

See also 
List of communities in Saskatchewan

References 

Designated places in Saskatchewan
McKillop No. 220, Saskatchewan
Organized hamlets in Saskatchewan
Division No. 6, Saskatchewan